Euophrys griswoldi is a jumping spider species in the genus Euophrys that lives in Namibia. The male was first described in 2014.

References

Endemic fauna of Namibia
Salticidae
Fauna of Namibia
Spiders of Africa
Spiders described in 2014